Elli is a personification of old age in Norse Mythology.

Elli may also refer to:

Saint Elli of Wales 
Greek cruiser Elli, ships of the Hellenic Navy
Elli-class frigate, a frigate class of the Hellenic Navy
Battle of Elli, a sea battle of the First Balkan War
"Elli", an MI5 mole and Soviet spy alleged to be Roger Hollis
Elli, and electoral ward in Llanelli to Carmarthenshire County Council, Wales
Elli, an album by Elli Medeiros
Elli (given name), the usage of the given name

People with the given name
Elli Hatschek (1901–1944), German Resistance member
Elli Kokkinou (born 1970), Greek singer
Elli Medeiros (born 1956) French singer and actress
Elli Papakonstantinou, stage director, librettist, translator and activist
Elli Parvo (1915-2010), Italian actress

People with the surname
Alberto Elli (born 1964), Italian cyclist

See also
Ellis

Estonian feminine given names